Turnstile Ridge is a ridge about 9 nautical miles (17 km) long, lying 3 nautical miles (6 km) north of Westhaven Nunatak at the northwest extremity of Britannia Range. So named by the Darwin Glacier Party (1957) of the Commonwealth Trans-Antarctic Expedition because snow passages resembling turnstiles occur throughout its length.

Ridges of Oates Land